The MTN Domestic Championship is the premier List A cricket championship in South Africa. This was the 28th time the championship was contested. Each team plays each other twice in a home and away leg. The top four teams progress to the semi-finals, with the winners of the semi-finals going through to the final.

The series starts on 14 October 2008 and plays through until the final on 17 January 2009.

Teams
 Cape Cobras in Cape Town & Paarl
 Dolphins in Durban & Pietermaritzburg
 Diamond Eagles in Bloemfontein & Kimberley
 Highveld Lions in Johannesburg and Potchefstroom
 Titans in Centurion & Benoni
 Warriors in East London & Port Elizabeth

Stadiums

Points table

Point system
 Win: 4 points
 Tie, no result or abandoned: 2 points
 Loss: 0 points
 Bonus points: 1 point awarded if the run rate is sufficiently higher than that of the opposition.

Fixtures & Results

November 2008

December 2008

January 2009

Knock Out Stages

Semi-finals

Final

See also
 MTN Domestic Championship
 MTN

References

External sources
 Series home at ESPN Cricinfo
 CricketArchive

South African domestic cricket competitions
2008–09 South African cricket season